UTC−05:00 is an identifier for a time offset from UTC of −05:00. 
In North America, it is observed in the Eastern Time Zone during standard time, and in the Central Time Zone during the other eight months (see Daylight saving time). The western Caribbean uses it year round.

As standard time (Northern Hemisphere winter)
Principal cities: New York, Washington, Philadelphia, Boston, Miami, Ottawa, Toronto, Montreal, Havana, Nassau, Port-au-Prince, Cockburn Town, Providenciales

North America
Canada (Eastern Time Zone)
Nunavut
Qikiqtaaluk Region except Resolute
Ontario
East of 90° West
Quebec
Most of province except easternmost area
United States (Eastern Time Zone)
Delaware
District of Columbia
Florida
Entire state except the counties of Bay, Calhoun, Escambia, Holmes, Jackson, Okaloosa, Santa Rosa, Walton, and Washington, and northern Gulf county (panhandle)
Georgia
Indiana
Except the northwestern counties of Jasper, Lake, LaPorte, Newton, Porter and Starke, and the southwestern counties of Gibson, Perry, Posey, Spencer, Vanderburgh and Warrick
Kentucky
Counties to the east of the counties of Breckinridge, Grayson, Hart, Green, Adair, Russell and Clinton
Maine
Maryland
Michigan
Except the western counties of Dickinson, Gogebic, Iron and Menominee
New England (states of Connecticut, Massachusetts, Maine, New Hampshire, Rhode Island and Vermont)
New Jersey
New York
North Carolina
Ohio
Pennsylvania
South Carolina
Tennessee
The counties of Scott, Morgan, Roane, Rhea, Meigs and Bradley, and all counties to the east of these
Virginia
West Virginia

Caribbean
Bahamas
Cuba

Haiti
United Kingdom
Turks and Caicos Islands

As daylight saving time (Northern Hemisphere summer)
Principal cities: Mexico City, Chicago, Dallas, Houston, St. Louis, Minneapolis, Austin, Kansas City, San Antonio, Nashville, Milwaukee, Oklahoma City, Winnipeg

North America
Canada (Central Time Zone)
Manitoba
Nunavut
All of Kivalliq Region (Coral Harbour)
Ontario
 West of 90° west longitude
Mexico
All except Baja California, Baja California Sur, Chihuahua, Nayarit, Quintana Roo, Sinaloa and Sonora.
United States (Central Time Zone)
Alabama
Arkansas
Florida
Illinois
Indiana
Northwestern counties of Jasper, Lake, LaPorte, Newton, Porter and Starke
Southwestern counties of Gibson, Perry, Posey, Spencer, Vanderburgh and Warrick
Iowa
Kansas
Entire state except westernmost counties
Kentucky
The counties of Breckinridge, Grayson, Hart, Green, Adair, Russell and Clinton, and all counties to the west of these
Louisiana
Michigan
The western counties of Dickinson, Gogebic, Iron and Menominee
Minnesota
Mississippi
Missouri
Nebraska
Central and eastern Nebraska
North Dakota
Entire state except southwest
Oklahoma
Entire state except Kenton
South Dakota
Eastern half
Tennessee
Counties to the west of the counties of Scott, Morgan, Roane, Rhea, and Hamilton
Texas
All except westernmost counties
Wisconsin

As standard time (year-round)
Principal cities: Bogotá, Lima, Kingston, Quito, Panama City, George Town

South America
Brazil
Acre
Amazonas (13 western municipalities, approximately marked by a line between Tabatinga and Porto Acre)
Colombia – Time in Colombia
Ecuador – Time in Ecuador (except Galápagos Islands)
Peru – Time in Peru

Caribbean
Jamaica
United Kingdom
British Overseas Territories
Cayman Islands
United States
United States Minor Outlying Islands
Navassa Island

North America
Canada – Eastern Time Zone
 Atikokan and New Osnaburgh/Pickle Lake area
 Southampton Island 
Mexico
Quintana Roo
Panama

As daylight saving time (Southern Hemisphere summer)
Principal settlement: Hanga Roa

East Pacific
Chile
Easter Island

See also

References

External links

UTC offsets